"Harvest Home" is the debut single of the Scottish band Big Country. It was first released as a single in 1982 and included on the band's debut album The Crossing.

Debut release
In early 1982, a newly formed Big Country declined a trade agreement with the Ensign label but later signed a recording contract with Mercury-Phonogram Records. The band went to London to begin work on their upcoming debut album. Late that year, they issued "Harvest Home". Despite missing a place in the UK Singles Chart, the band shortly after found themselves supporting post-punk heavyweights The Jam, on their sell-out farewell tour.

Critical praise
In their album review of The Crossing, Rolling Stone said that the "bagpipelike single-string riffs on such crackling tracks as" the "grandly martial Harvest Home are a nonstop, spine-tingling delight."

Music video
At the beginning of the music video, the members of the band are shown having a picnic together in the bushes. They later abandon the picnic area and enter a large building. Their musical instruments are inside, and the band walk in and start playing their instruments inside this building. Towards the end of the video, lead vocalist Stuart Adamson puts down his instrument and starts dancing.

References

External links
 Harvest Home song

1982 debut singles
Big Country songs
Song recordings produced by Steve Lillywhite
Songs written by Stuart Adamson
Songs written by Mark Brzezicki
Songs written by Tony Butler (musician)
Songs written by Bruce Watson (guitarist)
1982 songs
Mercury Records singles